Maria Eleonora I Boncompagni (1686–1745) was the Princess of Piombino, Marchioness of Populonia, Princess of Venosa and Countess of Conza, Lady di Scarlino, Populonia, Vignale, Abbadia del Fango, Suvereto, Buriano, Cerboli e Palmaiolan, and Lady princess of the Tuscan Archipelago including the islands of Elba, Montecristo, Pianosa, Gorgona, Capraia, and Isola del Giglio, from 1733 until her death.

She was the oldest of six daughters to her mother Ippolita Ludovisi. She succeeded her mother as sovereign at her death in 1733. She was married to her uncle, Don Antonio I Boncompagni, who became Prince of Piombino by the right of his wife (1658–1721).

References
 Mauro Carrara, Signori e principi di Piombino, Bandecchi & Vivaldi, Pontedera 1996.
http://www.guide2womenleaders.com/womeninpower/Womeninpower1700.htm

1686 births
1745 deaths
Princes of Piombino
18th-century Italian people
18th-century women rulers
17th-century Italian women
18th-century Italian women